is an action-adventure game developed by Tose and published by Capcom for the Wii. It was released in February 2009. The game is a port of the original Xbox 360 version of Dead Rising, and is the only game of the series for a Nintendo platform. The game was created following Capcom's success with the Wii version of Resident Evil 4.

The plot of the game remains the same as the original, in that players control Frank West, a photojournalist seeking to discover the truth behind a zombie outbreak within the fictional town of Willamette, Colorado, exploring the town's shopping mall to find answers while dealing with hordes of zombies and crazed survivors within. The game had a number of changes made to it, which received mixed feedback from reviewers.

Plot

Gameplay
Although gameplay is similar to the original, there are notable differences between it and the Wii version. The first notable difference is that Frank now operates from out of the mall's security room, and that he advances the main plot of the game by completing missions given to him by Otis, Brad, and Jessie; others see him rescuing the various survivors of the outbreak. While players do not have a single countdown clock for the entire story, missions are individually timed, and Frank is not permitted to roam freely around the mall when on a mission. Another notable difference is that the game has a greater emphasis on gun-based gameplay than the original. Firearms are a completely redefined element of the game - not only do guns now have more ammunition to them, players now use an over-the-shoulder perspective with aiming, which is further aided through the use of the Wii Remote to aim where the gun is pointing.

Other differences between the two versions include:

 A few of the psychopaths from the original appear as zombies in the Wii version, while some of the survivors of the original are absent.
 The Wii version features zombified animals, including poodles and parrots.
 The mall's size is significantly smaller in the Wii version.
 Frank cannot jump in the Wii version, and the photography system is absent.
 Players can change the color of the blood in the game.
 Both 72 Hour Mode and Overtime Mode are merged in the Wii Version, to form a single, story-driven mode of gameplay.
 Completing the main storyline on the Wii version, grants the player access to a range of minigames.
 There are fewer items scattered around the mall that can be used as weapons. 
 A gun store was added, though it is only accessible when the player rescues a character named Cletus.
In Wii version, all of the firearms were replaced into Resident Evil 4 style, includes Blacktail, Killer 7, and Red-9; As the original were absent.

Development
On July 15, 2008, Famitsu revealed that Dead Rising was in the process of being ported by Capcom for the Wii console, with plans for a release date within February 2009, with it later revealed that the port would be subtitled Chop Till You Drop, and in japan Zombie no Ikenie. The decision by Capcom to make a Wii version of the game came after the company ported over Resident Evil 4 for the Wii, and found it to be critically and commercially well received. Although the team working on the Dead Rising port used the same engine in the Wii version of Resident Evil 4, their work was constrained by the size of the budget and time for it, along with the Wii's graphical capabilities being not of the same level as the Xbox 360. While they attempted to retain as many features of the original as possible, they were forced to remove the photography system and limit the number of zombies that appeared on-screen to 100, around one eighth the amount that the original version could handle. It also worked to make a few changes, the biggest being to implement a more structured gameplay than that of the original by including a mission mechanic into the Wii version.

To assist with publishing the game, Capcom involved THQ in Australia with the game's development, while announcing that it expected to sell around 500,000 copies of the Wii version upon its launch.

Reception

Chop Till You Drop received mixed reviews following its launch. While Metacritic gave the game an average score of 61/100, X-Play gave it 2 out of 5 stars, criticising some of the changes, the control choices and the odd assortment of minigames, but praising it for using the Wii Remote for aiming in regards to ranged weapons, considering the game mechanic to be a vast improvement upon the original version. GameSpot gave the game a 6.5/10, praising the gunplay by commenting that it was "hard but satisfying" and that the Wii version was just the "same zombie-bashing fun as the original". IGN, who gave the game a 6.9/10, were critical of the graphics alongside other factors, stating "obviously, Dead Rising had to take a hit in the transition from 360 to Wii. But this isn't even good looking for the Wii, really. The story and dialogue are wretched, and a key feature (the ability to take photographs) has been inexplicably removed."

Notes

References

2009 video games
Action-adventure games
Capcom games
Dead Rising
Open-world video games
Post-apocalyptic video games
Video game remakes
Video games about zombies
Video games developed in Japan
Video games set in Colorado
Video games set in the United States
Wii games
Wii-only games